Dimitar Mutafov (born 25 November 1973) is a former Bulgarian footballer.

External links 
 

Bulgarian footballers
1973 births
Living people
First Professional Football League (Bulgaria) players
FC Hebar Pazardzhik players
PFC Belasitsa Petrich players
PFC Slavia Sofia players
PFC Rodopa Smolyan players
PFC Marek Dupnitsa players
FC Sportist Svoge players
PFC Minyor Pernik players
Association football defenders
People from Haskovo
Sportspeople from Haskovo Province